John Edvard Harryson (17 April 1926 – 28 November 2008) was a Swedish actor. He was the father of famous Swedish actor and television host Peter Harryson.

Born in Katrineholm, Harrysson was a renowned actor in Sweden. For a younger generation John Harrysson was known as the Swedish voice of Scrooge McDuck, Eeyore in Winnie the Pooh, Doctor Snuggles, Bert in Svenska Sesam (The second Swedish version of Sesame Street), and the Sheriff of Nottingham in Robin Hood (1973).

Selected filmography
 Desire (1946)
 Summer with Monika (1953)
 Voyage in the Night (1955)
 Darling of Mine (1955)
 Andersson's Kalle (1972)
 Woman Doctors (1984)

References

1926 births
2008 deaths
Swedish male film actors
Swedish male voice actors